Carla Ortiz Oporto (born 2 December 1975) is a Bolivian actress and philanthropist.

Early and personal life

She was born in Cochabamba, Bolivia. After a brief career as a professional tennis player, she moved to Mexico City in the 1990s and later, in 2005, to Los Angeles upon winning a bursary from the Georgetown University.

Controversy
Ortiz has been accused by journalist Christoph Reuter from Der Spiegel of engaging in Russian propaganda in relation to the Syrian Civil War. However, the accusations were received with criticism by Syrian German musician Hanin Elias.

Filmography

Films
Juana Azurduy ( TBA)
The curse of the Mayans (2017)
Voice of Syria (summer 2017)
Olvidados (2013)
The Man Who Shook the Hand of Vicente Fernandez (2012)
Escríbeme postales a Copacabana (2009)
Los Andes no creen en Dios (2007)
Shut Up and Shoot! (2006)
Che Guevara (2005)
Mooke (1998)

Soap operas
Secreto de amor (2001)
Primer Amor... a mil por hora (2000)
Todo se Vale (1999)
Mujeres engañadas (1999)
Gotita de amor (1998)

Series 

 La Reina Del sur ( season 3)

References

Bolivian telenovela actresses
Bolivian emigrants to the United States
People from Cochabamba
1976 births
Living people
Bolivian film actresses
20th-century Bolivian actresses
21st-century Bolivian actresses